Skeena was a federal electoral district in British Columbia, Canada, that was represented in the House of Commons of Canada from 1917 to 2004.

Geography
This was a rural, mostly wilderness, riding in northwestern B.C. It consisted of the northwest corner of the province of British Columbia, including the towns of Prince Rupert, Smithers and Terrace, and Haida Gwaii.

History
This riding was created in 1914 from parts of Comox—Atlin. It was first used in the 1917 federal election. The district was abolished in 2003. The entirety of this district went to help form Skeena—Bulkley Valley.

Members of Parliament 

This riding elected the following Members of Parliament:

Election results

See also 
 List of Canadian federal electoral districts
 Past Canadian electoral districts

External links 
Library of Parliament Riding Profile
 Expenditures - 2004
 Expenditures - 2000
 Expenditures – 1997
 Website of the Parliament of Canada

See also 
 List of Canadian federal electoral districts
 Past Canadian electoral districts

Former federal electoral districts of British Columbia
Terrace, British Columbia